Ashley Moloney (born 13 March 2000) is an Australian decathlete. He won bronze at the 2020 Olympic Games, the first Australian decathlete to win an Olympic medal.

Early years 
Moloney attended school in Browns Plains, a suburb in Logan Qld. Moloney was the fastest at primary school and enjoyed the crowd that gathered when he broke school high jump records. He competed in jumps, triple/high/pole and sprints for his school, region and state. In 2015, aged 15, he won the Australian All Schools U16 high jump title with a leap of 2.00 metres. Moloney then he competed in his first combined event on just two weeks of training.

Moloney's coach, Eric Brown, believed that Moloney could make the Olympics as a decathlete with a lot of hard work. In early 2016, in his second competition, he won the national U18 title, just days after he turned 16. In September 2016, he tallied 7328 with a sub-11 100m, 14+ metres in the shot, sub-14 hurdles, 4.60m vault and 4:50 1500m.

Achievements 

In 2017 Moloney broke the U18 Australian Decathlon Points Record  previously held by Jake Stein.

He won the gold medal at the 2018 World Junior Championships in Tampere. In achieving this result, Moloney broke the Competition Record, previously held by Niklas Kaul, and the Oceania Junior Record previously held by Cedric Dubler. At the mid-2019 Oceania Championships, while still a teenager, Moloney scored 8103 points with the senior implements, raising the prospect of qualifying for the 2020 Olympics. Although injury in early 2020 threatened Ash's Olympic dream, the COVID-19 pandemic caused the Tokyo Olympics to be postponed and Ash and his training partner Cedric Dubler were able to qualify for them at the end of 2020. In doing so Moloney broke the Australian senior and Oceanian records for the Decathlon, increasing Jagan Hames's previous records by 2 points to 8492 points.

In winning bronze at the 2020 Olympic Games, the first Australian decathlete to medal at an Olympics, he further improved the Oceanian and Australian record to 8649 points.  Needing to complete the final 1500m event within several seconds of his closest points competitors, or better, the efforts of Ashley's fellow Australian decathlete Cedric Dubler to motivate him in the final stages of this race were lauded by the Australian and even world media as one of the most memorable moments of the Tokyo Olympics.

Ash competed in the 2022 World Indoor Athletics Championships in the Men's Heptathlon where he finished the first day's competition in third place with 3,551 points. He finished in 3rd place with 6344 points, an Oceania Area Record and the highest third place tally ever for an indoor heptathlon.

Personal bests

Outdoor 

Indoor

International competition record

Personal life
Moloney joined the Jimboomba Little Athletics Club when he was 12 years old. He hails from Logan in Southeast Queensland. He attended Regents Park State School and Browns Plains State High School.

References

External links

Living people
2000 births
Australian decathletes
World Athletics U20 Championships winners
Athletes (track and field) at the 2020 Summer Olympics
Olympic athletes of Australia
Olympic decathletes
Medalists at the 2020 Summer Olympics
Olympic bronze medalists in athletics (track and field)
Olympic bronze medalists for Australia
World Athletics Indoor Championships medalists